This is a list of notable alumni of the Alpha Epsilon Pi fraternity.

Ross Friedman (born 1992), Major League Soccer player

Italics indicate a deceased member. Deceased AEPis are said to enter the "Chapter Eternal."

References

Alpha Epsilon Pi
brothers